Thiago Rodrigues da Silva (born 12 June 1996), or simply Thiago, is a Brazilian footballer who plays for Arouca as a goalkeeper.

Career

Flamengo
Thiago made his professional debut for Flamengo in a Campeonato Carioca match against Portuguesa in March 2017.

Thiago played his first Brazilian Série A match against Avaí at Estádio da Ressacada on 11 June 2017 in a 1-1 draw.

On 4 January 2019, Atlético Goianiense announced that they had loaned Thiago for one year. But 16 days later, the deal was cancelled because of a divergence about a clause in the loan deal that demanded Thiago to play at least 60% of the club matches.

América (MG) (loan)
On 20 May 2019, he moved to América Mineiro, on loan until the end of 2019.

Career statistics

Honours
Flamengo
 Campeonato Carioca: 2017

Estoril Praia
 Liga Portugal 2: 2020–21

References

External links

1996 births
Living people
Footballers from Rio de Janeiro (city)
Brazilian footballers
Brazilian expatriate footballers
Association football goalkeepers
Campeonato Brasileiro Série A players
Campeonato Brasileiro Série B players
Liga Portugal 2 players
CR Flamengo footballers
América Futebol Clube (MG) players
G.D. Estoril Praia players
F.C. Arouca players
Brazilian expatriate sportspeople in Portugal
Expatriate footballers in Portugal